Stachura is a Polish-language surname. Originally it was a given name derived from the name Stanisław, diminutive: Stach.  Notable people with the surname include:

 Cyril Stachura (born 1965), Slovak footballer and manager
 Edward Stachura (1937–1979), Polish poet and writer
 Jan Stachura (born 1948), Polish cyclist
 Peter Stachura, British historian and writer
 Stanisław Stachura (born 1941), Polish football manager

See also
 
 Stachyra

References

Polish-language surnames